Presidential elections were held in Peru in 1904. José Pardo y Barreda of the Civilista Party was elected unopposed.

Results

References

Presidential elections in Peru
Peru
1904 in Peru
Single-candidate elections